Takuboku may refer to:
 Takuboku, Japanese word for "woodpecker" 
 Takuboku Ishikawa (1886–1912), Japanese poet, known as just Takuboku
 4672 Takuboku (1988 HB), a main-belt asteroid, named after the poet